Rough Riding Romance is a lost 1919 American silent Western film directed by Arthur Rosson and starring cowboy Tom Mix. It was produced and distributed by Fox Film Corporation.

Plot
As described in a film magazine, Phineas Dobbs (Mix), cowboy and dairyman, becomes rich when oil is discovered on his land. His first thought is to give a party with the whole town as his guests. The party is at its height when a mysterious and beautiful young woman with two frock-coated escorts alight from a nearby stalled train who are menaced by the town badman. Disposing of the bad man in his best style, Phineas takes to the open country on his horse. The train passes and the lady throws him a note from the window, asking him to follow and rescue her. His quest takes him to San Francisco and thence to an estate in the San Mateo hills, where a secret society of foreign noblemen are seeking to force the young woman to marry one of their members. Her father is held prisoner and his life is to be the price of her refusal. Phineas mixes in and, with the help of his trusted steed, effects the rescue of the young woman, who turns out to be a princess and her father a king. Sometime later, after he has returned to the ranch, the young woman appears and they are married.

Cast
 Tom Mix as Phineas Dobbs
 Juanita Hansen as The Princess
 Pat Chrisman as Curley
 Spottiswoode Aitken as The King
 Jack Nelson as Pietro The Spy
 Sid Jordan as Pat Leary
 Frankie Lee
 Tony as Tom Mix's horse

Preservation status
Only a fragment of the film is preserved at the Library of Congress.

See also
 1937 Fox vault fire

References

External links

 
 

1919 films
1919 Western (genre) films
Lost American films
Films directed by Arthur Rosson
Fox Film films
American black-and-white films
Lost Western (genre) films
1919 lost films
Silent American Western (genre) films
1910s American films